Eidet or Eide is a village in Bø Municipality in Nordland county, Norway. The village is located on the large island of Langøya in the Vesterålen archipelago. Malnes Church was moved here from the small village of Malnes, just south of the village of Hovden in 1829.

Eide is connected to the village of Nykvåg to the north and to the village of Rise to the south by Norwegian County Road 915.

References

Bø, Nordland
Villages in Nordland